Morton Leonard Heilig (December 22, 1926 – May 14, 1997) was an American pioneer in virtual reality (VR) technology and a filmmaker. He applied his cinematographer experience and with the help of his partner developed the Sensorama over several years from 1957, patenting it in 1962.

Sensorama

It was big, bulky, and shaped like a 1980s era video arcade game.  The Sensorama was quite impressive for 1960s technology.  The viewing cabinet gave the viewer the experience of riding a motorcycle on the streets of Brooklyn.  The viewer felt the wind on their face, the vibration of the motorcycle seat, a 3D view, and even smells of the city.

Heilig wanted to create “cinema of the future.”   The Sensorama was doomed, however, from the high costs of the filmmaking. The problem was not that the apparatus addressed the wrong senses; the business community just couldn't figure out how to sell it. He was not able to find the amount of funds necessary to create new 3-D films “obtained with three 35 mm cameras mounted on the cameraman.”

Filmmaker

Heilig was the producer, director, writer, cinematographer and editor of the short films "Assembly Line" (1961) and "Destination: Man" (1965). He was the producer, director, writer, cinematographer and editor of the feature film "Once" (1974). He directed episodes of the TV series Diver Dan (1961).  He was a production executive for the film They Shoot Horses Don't They? (1969).

Morton Heilig is buried at Eden Memorial Park Cemetery in Mission Hills, Los Angeles, California, USA.

References

External links 
 mortonheilig.com

1926 births
1997 deaths
20th-century American inventors
Burials at Eden Memorial Park Cemetery
Virtual reality pioneers